In probability theory and directional statistics, the von Mises distribution (also known as the circular normal distribution or Tikhonov distribution) is a continuous probability distribution on the circle. It is a close approximation to the wrapped normal distribution, which is the circular analogue of the normal distribution. A freely diffusing angle  on a circle is a wrapped normally distributed random variable with an unwrapped variance that grows linearly in time. On the other hand, the von Mises distribution is the stationary distribution of a drift and diffusion process on the circle in a harmonic potential, i.e. with a preferred orientation. The von Mises distribution is the maximum entropy distribution for circular data when the real and imaginary parts of the first circular moment are specified. The von Mises distribution is a special case of the von Mises–Fisher distribution on the N-dimensional sphere.

Definition 
The von Mises probability density function for the angle x is given by:

where I0() is the modified Bessel function of the first kind of order 0, with this scaling constant chosen so that the distribution sums to unity: 

The parameters μ and 1/ are analogous to μ and σ (the mean and variance) in the normal distribution:
 μ is a measure of location (the distribution is clustered around μ), and
  is a measure of concentration (a reciprocal measure of dispersion, so 1/ is analogous to σ).
 If  is zero, the distribution is uniform, and for small , it is close to uniform.
 If  is large, the distribution becomes very concentrated about the angle μ with  being a measure of the concentration. In fact, as  increases, the distribution approaches a normal distribution in x  with mean μ and variance 1/.

The probability density can be expressed as a series of Bessel functions

 

where Ij(x) is the modified Bessel function of order j.

The cumulative distribution function is not analytic and is best found by integrating the above series. The indefinite integral of the probability density is:

The cumulative distribution function will be a function of the lower limit of
integration x0:

Moments 

The moments of the von Mises distribution are usually calculated as the moments of the complex exponential z = e rather than the angle x itself. These moments are referred to as circular moments. The variance calculated from these moments is referred to as the circular variance. The one exception to this is that the "mean" usually refers to the argument of the complex mean.

The nth raw moment of z is:

where the integral is over any interval  of length 2π. In calculating the above integral, we use the fact that z = cos(nx) + i sin(nx) and the Bessel function identity:

The mean of the complex exponential z  is then just

and the circular mean value of the angle x is then taken to be the argument μ. This is the expected or preferred direction of the angular random variables. The variance of z, or the circular variance of x is:

Limiting behavior 
When  is large, the distribution resembles a normal distribution.  More specifically, for large positive real numbers ,

where σ2 = 1/ and the difference between the left hand side and the right hand side of the approximation converges uniformly to zero as  goes to infinity.  Also, when  is small, the probability density function resembles a uniform distribution:

where the interval for the uniform distribution  is the chosen interval of length  (i.e.   when  is in the interval and  when  is not in the interval).

Estimation of parameters 
A series of N measurements  drawn from a von Mises distribution may be used to estimate certain parameters of the distribution. The average of the series  is defined as

and its expectation value will be just the first moment:

In other words,  is an unbiased estimator of the first moment. If we assume that the mean  lies in the interval , then Arg will be a (biased) estimator of the mean .

and its expectation value is  

In other words, the statistic

Distribution of the mean 
The distribution of the sample mean  for the von Mises distribution is given by:

Note that product term in parentheses is just the distribution of the mean for a circular uniform distribution.

This means that the distribution of the mean direction  of a von Mises distribution   is a von Mises distribution , or, equivalently, .

Entropy 

By definition, the information entropy of the von Mises distribution is

where  is any interval of length . The logarithm of the density of the Von Mises distribution is straightforward:

The characteristic function representation for the Von Mises distribution is:

where . Substituting these expressions into the entropy integral, exchanging the order of integration and summation, and using the orthogonality of the cosines, the entropy may be written:

Notice that the Von Mises distribution maximizes the entropy when the real and imaginary parts of the first circular moment are specified or, equivalently, the circular mean and circular variance are specified.

See also
 Bivariate von Mises distribution
 Directional statistics
 Von Mises–Fisher distribution
 Kent distribution

References

Further reading 

 Abramowitz, M. and Stegun, I. A.  (ed.), Handbook of Mathematical Functions, National Bureau of Standards, 1964; reprinted Dover Publications, 1965. 
 "Algorithm AS 86: The von Mises Distribution Function", Mardia, Applied Statistics, 24, 1975 (pp. 268–272).
 "Algorithm 518, Incomplete Bessel Function I0: The von Mises Distribution", Hill, ACM Transactions on Mathematical Software, Vol. 3, No. 3, September 1977, Pages 279–284.
 Best, D. and Fisher, N. (1979). Efficient simulation of the von Mises distribution. Applied Statistics, 28, 152–157.
 Evans, M., Hastings, N., and Peacock, B., "von Mises Distribution". Ch. 41 in Statistical Distributions, 3rd ed. New York. Wiley 2000.
 Fisher, Nicholas I., Statistical Analysis of Circular Data. New York. Cambridge 1993.
 "Statistical Distributions", 2nd. Edition, Evans, Hastings, and Peacock, John Wiley and Sons, 1993, (chapter 39). 
 

Continuous distributions
Directional statistics
Exponential family distributions